The 1927 Boston University Terriers football team was an American football team that represented Boston University as an independent during the 1927 college football season. In its second season under head coaches Reggie Brown and Edward N. Robinson, the team compiled a 3–4–1 record and outscored opponents by a total of 65 to 53.

Schedule

References

Boston University
Boston University Terriers football seasons
Boston University football